The following is a list of Minnesota weather records observed at various stations across the state during the Over 160 years. Minnesota is a state in the Upper Midwestern region of the United States.  Due to its location in the northern plains of the United States its climate is one of extremes.  Minnesota's history of nearly continuous meteorological record keeping stretches back two centuries to 1819 when Fort Snelling was settled.  By 1871 the first official government observations were taking place in the Twin Cities and by the late 19th century and early 20th century most statewide stations that exist today were in operation.

Temperature

Overall

By month

Precipitation

Rain

Snow

Tornadoes

Hail

Flooding

Record flood stages for selected cities in Minnesota

Other records

See also
General
List of weather records
Large-scale events that affected Minnesota
2007 Midwest flooding
Mid-June 1992 Tornado Outbreak
1968 Tracy tornado
1991 Halloween blizzard
Great Storm of 1975
1936 North American heat wave
1997 Red River Flood
Armistice Day Blizzard

References

External links
 Minnesota State Climatology Office
 National Weather Service - Central Region Headquarters

Climate of Minnesota
Lists of weather records
American records
Weather